Miguel de los Santos Álvarez (1817–1892) was a Spanish writer.

People from Valladolid
1817 births
1892 deaths
19th-century Spanish writers
19th-century Spanish male writers